Power sharing is a practice in conflict resolution where multiple groups distribute political, military, or economic power among themselves according to agreed rules. It can refer to any formal framework or informal pact that regulates the distribution of power between divided communities. Since the end of the Cold War, power-sharing systems have become increasingly commonplace in negotiating settlements for armed conflict. Two common theoretical approaches to power sharing are consociationalism and centripetalism.

Dimensions of power sharing
Broadly, power-sharing agreements contain provisions relating to at least one of the following: Political, economic, military, or territorial control.

Political power-sharing involves rules governing the distribution of political offices and the exercise of decision-making powers. Power may be shared by guaranteeing the inclusion of all significant parties simultaneously in the governing cabinet through rules on grand coalition formation. Alternatively, it may involve sharing power by guaranteeing sequential access to political office, like a rotating premiership. Electoral systems can provide power-sharing through political proportionality, which better allows for minority groups to remain competitive and win a portion of political power through democratic elections.

Proportionality also informs economic power-sharing, as the distribution of public resources may be instituted respective to the size of communities. In neopatrimonial systems, political office may also be closely related to economic opportunity, meaning an equitable distribution of political power overlaps with economic power-sharing.

Theories of power sharing
Power-sharing theories make empirical and normative claims about the utility or desirability of power-sharing systems for conflict management in divided societies. Two salient power-sharing theories, which stake competing claims, are consociationalism and centripetalism. Empirically, each theory prescribes different systems for power-sharing, such as consociationalism's proportional voting compared to centripetalism's alternative vote.

Consociationalism

Consociationalism is a form of democratic power sharing. Political scientists define a consociational state as one which has major internal divisions along ethnic, religious, or linguistic lines, with none of the divisions large enough to form a majority group, but which remains stable due to consultation among the elites of these groups. Consociational states are often contrasted with states with majoritarian electoral systems.

Consociational power-sharing in ethnically pluralistic societies consists in a set of measures and rules which distribute decision-making rights in order to guarantee fair and equal participation of the representatives of all main ethnic groups in decision-making; in this way it reassures minorities that their interests will be preserved. 

The goals of consociationalism are governmental stability, the survival of the power-sharing arrangements, the survival of democracy, and the avoidance of violence.  In a consociational state, all groups, including minorities, are represented on the political and economic stages. Supporters of the consociationalism argue that it is a more realistic option in deeply divided societies than integrationist approaches to conflict management.

Centripetalism

Centripetalism, sometimes called integrationism, is a form of democratic power sharing for divided societies (usually along ethnic, religious or social lines) which aims to encourage the parties towards moderate and compromising policies and to reinforce the centre of the divided political spectrum. As a theory, centripetalism developed out of the criticism of consociationalism by Donald L.Horowitz. Both models aim to provide institutional prescriptions for divided societies. While consociationalism aims to give inclusion and representation to each ethnic group, centripetalism aims to depoliticize ethnicity and to encourage the establishment of multi-ethnic parties.

Examples
Early modern examples of power sharing include the Peace of Augsburg and Peace of Westphalia. The Good Friday Agreement of 1998 in Northern Ireland is one of the famous examples of power sharing.

Early examples of consociational power sharing include the Netherlands (1917–1967), Belgium since 1918, and Lebanon since 1943.

Examples of centripetal power sharing include Fiji (1997–2006), Northern Ireland (June 1973 – May 1974), Papua New Guinea, Sri Lanka, Indonesia, Kenya and Nigeria.

See also
Comparative politics
Job sharing
Peace and conflict studies

References
 

 
Political theories
Comparative politics
Ethnicity in politics
Democracy